Globulation 2 is a real-time strategy game, available in beta as of January 2009. The game updates on an irregular release cycle and is available in many Linux distribution's package repositories. The game minimizes gaming micromanagement by automatically assigning tasks to units. The game is developed as free and open source software under the GNU GPL-3.0-or-later.

Gameplay
In Globulation, the point is to either kill all of the enemies' units, to convert all of them to your side, or to kill the enemy by stealing their resources. The game can be played by a single player, through a local area network (LAN), or through the Internet via Ysagoon Online Game (YOG), a meta-server. It also features AI for playing with computer teams, a scripting language for versatile gameplay or tutorials and an integrated map editor.

Reception and impact 
Globulation 2 was rated 5 stars (out of 5) on The Linux Game Tome gaming news website. The game was ported cross-platform (Linux distributions, BSD Unix, GNU Hurd, Apple Mac OS, Microsoft Windows, etc.) and included in several major free operating system distributions such as Debian and Ubuntu.

See also

 List of open source games

References

External links

 
 Globulation 2 at GNU Savannah
 
 Video of FOSDEM 2008 presentation

2009 video games
Strategy video games
Real-time strategy video games
Multiplayer online games
MacOS games
Linux games
Windows games
Open-source video games